This list of dinosaur-bearing rock formations is a list of geologic formations in which dinosaur fossils have been documented.

Containing body fossils
 List of stratigraphic units with dinosaur body fossils
 List of stratigraphic units with few dinosaur genera
 List of stratigraphic units with indeterminate dinosaur fossils

Containing trace fossils
 List of stratigraphic units with dinosaur trace fossils
 List of stratigraphic units with dinosaur tracks
 List of stratigraphic units with ornithischian tracks
 List of stratigraphic units with sauropodomorph tracks
 List of stratigraphic units with theropod tracks

See also

 Lists of fossiliferous stratigraphic units
 List of fossil sites
 Mesozoic

 
Formations
Mesozoic paleontological sites
Lists of fossiliferous stratigraphic units by preserved taxon